This is a list of people with the name St. George (or Saint George). For saints called George and other uses, see Saint George (disambiguation).

Surname
 Arthur St George, Irish MP
 Arthur St George (dean), Church of Ireland clergyman
 Christopher St George, Irish MP
 George Saint-George (1841–1924), British musical instrument maker and composer
 George St George (Carrick MP) (died 1713), Irish politician, MP for Carrick
 George St George, 1st Baron St George (–1735), Irish politician, MP for County Roscommon 1692–1715
 George St George (Athlone MP) (1682–1762), Irish politician, MP for Athlone
 Henry Saint-George (1866–1917), British violinist and writer about the violin, son of George Saint-George
 Henry St George, Garter King of Arms
 Henry St George, the younger, Garter King of Arms
 Henry St George (died 1723), Irish MP
 Henry St George (died 1763), Irish MP
 John St. George, soldier
 Oliver St George, Irish politician
 Sir Oliver St George, 1st Baronet
 Richard St George, Clarenceux King of Arms
 Richard St George (died 1726), Irish MP
 Richard St George (died 1755), Irish MP
 Richard St George (died 1790), Irish MP
 Sir Richard St George, 1st Baronet
 Sir Richard St George, 2nd Baronet
 St George Gore-St George, 5th Baronet
 St George St George, 1st Baron St George
 Thomas St George, Garter King of Arms
 Thomas St George (died 1785), Irish MP

Forename
 St George Ashe, Church of Ireland bishop
 Saint-George Ashe, oarsman
 St George Caulfeild, Irish MP
 St George Daly, Irish MP
 Denis St. George Daly, polo player
 St George Lowther, 4th Earl of Lonsdale
 St. George Jackson Mivart, 19th century British biologist
 St George Richardson, Irish MP
 St. George Tucker, US lawyer
 Tudor St. George Tucker, Australian painter
 St George Gore-St George, Irish baronet
 St George St George, 1st Baron St George
 Murray Seafield St George Head, English actor and singer

Fictional characters
 Charlie St. George, a character in the Netflix series 13 Reasons Why

See also
 St George Baronets
 Baron St George

Surnames